Lise Thouin (10 July 1950) is a French Canadian actress and writer. She was married to the director Jean-Claude Lord until his death in January 2022.

Filmography
1972 : The Doves (Les Colombes) - Josianne Boucher
1974 : Bingo - collaboration on scenario with her husband, and release as singer of single "Bingo" written by Michel Conte
1976 : Let's Talk About Love (Parlez-nous d'amour) - script
1976 : Grand-Papa TV - Mme Lacoste
1977 : Panic (Panique) - Hélène
1979 : Chocolate Eclair (Éclair au chocolat) - Marie-Louise
1986 : Lance et compte TV - Nicole Gagnon
1987 : La Grenouille et la baleine - Anne (and screenwriting)
1992 : L'Amour avec un Grand A, TV episode L'Amour, c'est pas assez
1993 : Les Grands procès, TV episode Ginette Couture-Marchand - Dr. Légaré
2010 : Fatal

References

1950 births
Living people
Canadian women screenwriters
Canadian television writers
Canadian film actresses
Canadian television actresses
Writers from Quebec
Actresses from Quebec
Canadian writers in French
Canadian women television writers